Jonathan Richards may refer to:

Jonathan Richards (sailor) (born 1954), British competitive sailor and Olympic medalist
Jonathan Richards (author), American author, journalist, actor, and cartoonist
Jonathan Richards, comic book character also known as Hyperstorm
Jonathan Richards (Massachusetts politician), representative to the Great and General Court

See also
John Richards (disambiguation)
Jon Richards, American Democratic Party member of the Wisconsin State Assembly